Holy Sepulchre Cemetery is located in East Orange and Newark, New Jersey. The Garden State Parkway runs through the two halves of the cemetery (exit 144 and exit 145, respectively).   This cemetery was established in 1859 and is maintained by the Roman Catholic Archdiocese of Newark.

In the 1950s, the newly-constructed Garden State Parkway cut directly through the cemetery. Hundreds of graves had to be moved prior to construction. Both sides of the cemetery are visible to drivers on the Parkway today.

Notable burials

 Thomas J. Callan (1853–1908), Indian Wars Medal of Honor recipient
 Jack Farrell (1857–1914), Major League Baseball player for 11 seasons, from 1879–1889
 Edward F. McDonald (1844–1892), represented New Jersey's 7th congressional district from 1895–1899
 Cornelius Augustine McGlennon (1878–1931), represented  from 1919–1921
 Frank Joseph McNulty (1872–1926), Representative from New Jersey 8th District from 1923–1925
 Paul John Moore (1868–1938), represented New Jersey's 8th congressional district from 1927–1929
 Edward L. O'Neill (1903–1948), represented New Jersey's 11th congressional district from 1937–1939
 Albert Oss (1818–1898), Civil War Medal of Honor recipient
 James Smith, Jr. (1851–1927), U.S. Senator from New Jersey from 1893–1899
 Thomas Sullivan (1859–1940), Indian Wars Medal of Honor recipient

References

External links 
 Search for burials in the Archdiocese of Newark database
 Old Newark Cemeteries: Holy Sepulchre Cemetery
 Political Graveyard: Holy Sepulchre Cemetery
 

Cemeteries in Essex County, New Jersey
Roman Catholic Archdiocese of Newark
Roman Catholic cemeteries in New Jersey
1859 establishments in New Jersey
East Orange, New Jersey
Garden State Parkway
Geography of Newark, New Jersey